The Reedsburg Brewery is a historic brewery located in Reedsburg, Wisconsin. The company was founded in the 1860s, during the hops boom. The building was rebuilt in 1904, after a large fire destroyed the original structure. The Reedsburg Brewery served as the primary manufacturer of beer for the city, up until Prohibition, in the 1920s. It reopened again in 1933, but eventually had to close in 1950 due to decreasing sales. In 1984, it was added to the National Register of Historic Places.

The building sat unused for over 30 years, occasionally being used as a warehouse. In 1987, after pressure from the city, a developer remodeled the interior of the structure into apartments. The building still serves as apartments, with most of the exterior kept intact.

History

Early history 
The hop boom of the 1860s brought many businesses into Reedsburg. The Reedsburg Brewing Company was one of them. Frank and Florin Meckler founded the business, and built a brewery on North Walnut Street. It was fairly successful, but suffered several fires over the next 10 years. In 1880 the owners sold the business, but it was only producing 350 barrels of beer per year, compared to the 1,000 barrels in previous years. A large fire burned down this building in 1904.

1900s - present 
On the same site in 1904, the new Reedsburg Brewery building was built, out of brick. This new building was able to produce 5,000 barrels of beer every year. The business closed in 1950, after sales declined heavily. For the next 30 years, the building was left unused. In 1984, it was listed on the National Register of Historic Places, and was remodeled into apartments in 1987.

References 

Reedsburg, Wisconsin
National Register of Historic Places in Sauk County, Wisconsin
Industrial buildings and structures in Wisconsin
Commercial buildings completed in 1904